Puiatu is a village in Viljandi Parish, Viljandi County, Estonia. It has a population of 281 (as of 4 January 2010).

References

Villages in Viljandi County
Kreis Fellin